Turn It Up is a 2000 action hood film written and directed by Robert Adetuyi and starring Ja Rule, Pras, Faith Evans and Jason Statham.

Cast
 Pras as Diamond
 Ja Rule as David "Gage" Williams
 Jason Statham as Mr. B
 Tamala Jones as Kia
 Vondie Curtis-Hall as Cliff
 John Ralston as Mr. White
 Chris Messina as Baz
 Eugene Clark as Marshall
 Faith Evans as Natalie
 Chang Tseng as Mr. Chang

Production
Turn It Up was filmed in Toronto, Ontario, Canada and Denial NiteClub, 360 Adelaide St. W, Toronto, Ontario, Canada.

Reception
On Rotten Tomatoes, the film has an approval rating of 8%, based on reviews from 38 critics. The website's consensus reads, "Reviewers say Turn It Up has a derivative feel, running through too many urban movie cliches." On Metacritic, it has a score of 18 out of 100, based on reviews from 16 critics, indicating "overwhelming dislike". Audiences surveyed by CinemaScore gave the film a grade D− on a scale of A to F.

Box office
The film grossed $1,247,949 during its brief theatrical run.

See also 
 List of hood films

References

External links
 
 

2000 films
2000 drama films
2000s crime drama films
2000s hip hop films
American crime drama films
Films directed by Robert Adetuyi
Films set in Brooklyn
Films shot in Toronto
Hood films
New Line Cinema films
2000 directorial debut films
2000s English-language films
2000s American films